The 2007 NFL Europa season was the 15th season in 17 years of the American Football league that started out as the World League of American Football. 2007 was the first season the league was known as NFL Europa after being called NFL Europe since 1998. The NFL folded the league after the 2007 season.

World Bowl XV
World Bowl XV was held on Saturday, June 23, 2007, at Commerzbank-Arena in Frankfurt, Germany. The Hamburg Sea Devils defeated the Frankfurt Galaxy, 37–28.

References

 
2007 in American football
NFL Europe (WLAF) seasons